Bhanurangsi Savangwongse, the Prince Bhanubandhu Vongsevoradej (11 January 1859 – 13 June 1928)  was a son of King Mongkut of Siam and Queen Debsirindra.

Although the Prince held a number of posts in the government of his elder brother, King Chulalongkorn, including the post of Commander-in-Chief of the Royal Siamese Army, he is best remembered as the founder of the Thai postal service and the first Field marshal in Royal Siamese Army during King Vajiravudh.

His most famous son is the Formula One racer, Prince Birabongse Bhanutej Bhanubandh, better known as Prince Bira.

Early life and education 

Prince Bhanurangsi Savangwongse born on 11 January 1860 at the Grand Palace, Bangkok. He has 3 brothers and sisters, including King Chulalongkorn, Princess Chandrmondol and Prince Chaturonrasmi. After 2 years, his mother died. Later, his father died when he was 10 years old. He was the scatterer of rice in the procession of the royal funeral of King Mongkut. When he was 12 years old King Chulalongkorn appointed him as Prince Brother, with a royal ceremony at the Dusit Maha Prasat Throne Hall. When he was 13 years old he was ordained as a novice at Wat Phra Kaew with Supreme Patriarch Pavares Variyalongkorn as a preceptor then went out to Wat Bowonniwet Vihara.

He began his studies in the school of female teachers and began to study by himself. After that, he studied the books of Khmer and Pali at the Bureau of Phraya Priyatthi Dhammada when he is ordained. After that, he studied military education at the Bureau of the King's Guard since 1872 and learning the Thai language from Phraya Srisoonthorn Waham (Noi Ajarayangkul) including studying civil service traditions and royal traditions from Prince Mahamala, the Prince Bamrapporapak.

Careers 
He carried out military service in a special officer rank, with a first lieutenant's uniform in Bureau of the King's Guard When King Chulalongkorn travelled to Singapore (2nd time) and Burma, parts of England throughout India including the rising districts of Siam along the western coast of Malaya. He held positions including Minister of the Council and Privy Council of King Chulalongkorn, Chancellor of the Ministry of Defense, The Privy Council of King Rama VI and the President and Privy Councilor in King Rama VII, Inspector General, Commander of the Navy Department and Director-General of the Post and Telegraph Department.

Death 
Prince Bhanurangsi Savangwongse died on 13 June 1928 aged 68 at Buraphaphirom Palace.

Issue 
He had 16 children, 9 sons and 7 daughters:

 Princess Dibyasambandh
 Prince Nibanna Bhanubongse
 Prince Siriwongse Vadhanadej
 Princess (unnamed)
 Princess Chalermkhetramongmol
 Prince Suriyon Yiembayab
 Prince Ballap Danaya
 Prince Daeng (stillborn)
 Princess Khaimuk
 Princess Rambhai Prabha
 Prince Aphassorawongse
 Prince Birabongse Bhanudej
 Prince Norasetdha Suriyalaksana
 Prince Chirasakdi Suprabhas (:th:พระวรวงศ์เธอ พระองค์เจ้าจิรศักดิ์สุประภาต)
 Princess Lek (died at six days old)

Ancestry

References

Thai male Chao Fa
19th-century Chakri dynasty
20th-century Chakri dynasty
Bhanubandh family
Children of Mongkut
Field marshals of Thailand
Ministers of Defence of Thailand
Knights Grand Cordon of the Order of Chula Chom Klao
Knights of the Ratana Varabhorn Order of Merit
Knights Grand Commander (Senangapati) of the Order of Rama
Recipients of the Dushdi Mala Medal, Pin of Arts and Science
Recipients of the Order of the White Eagle (Russia)
1859 births
1928 deaths
Commanders-in-chief of the Royal Thai Army
Members of the Privy Council of Thailand
19th-century military history of Thailand
Sons of kings